This is a list of the National Register of Historic Places listings in Rains County, Texas.

This is intended to be a complete list of properties listed on the National Register of Historic Places in Rains County, Texas. There are four properties listed on the National Register in the county including one site that is both a State Antiquities Landmark and a Recorded Texas Historic Landmark.

Current listings

The publicly disclosed locations of National Register properties may be seen in a mapping service provided.

|}

See also

National Register of Historic Places listings in Texas
Recorded Texas Historic Landmarks in Rains County

References

External links

Rains County, Texas
Rains County
Buildings and structures in Rains County, Texas